Abraham Blauvelt was a Dutch privateer, pirate and explorer of Central America in the 1630s, after whom both the Bluefield River and the neighboring town of Bluefields, Nicaragua were named.

One of the last of the Dutch corsairs of the mid-17th century, Abraham Blauvelt was first recorded exploring the coasts of present-day Honduras and Nicaragua in service of the Dutch West India Company. He later traveled to England in an effort to gain support to establish a colony in Nicaragua near the city where Bluefields, Nicaragua presently stands. Around 1640 Blauvelt became a privateer serving the Swedish East India Company and in 1644 he commanded his own ship successfully raiding Spanish shipping from a base in southwest Jamaica, today known as Bluefields, Jamaica, and selling the cargo and prizes to the Dutch colony of New Amsterdam (New York). After peace between Spain and the Netherlands was reached with the signing of the Peace of Westphalia in 1648, Blauvelt, unable to stay in New Amsterdam, instead sailed to Newport, Rhode Island in early 1649 to sell his remaining cargo. However the colonial governor seized one of Blauvelt's prizes and with his crew arguing over their shares, the local colonists, fearing that Rhode Island acquire a reputation of trading with pirates, forced Blauvelt to leave the colony. For the next several years Blauvelt commanded a French ship called La Garse, later living among the natives of Cape Gracias a Dios near the border of Honduras and Nicaragua, until the early 1660s when he was recruited for Christopher Myngs' sacking of the Spanish colony of Campeche in 1663. However, nothing more is known about his activities after this time.

Legacy 
Blauvelt is best remembered as a Jewish pirate who fought to defend the honor of the Jewish people, raiding only Spanish ships as revenge for the exile of his people from Spain. His name was immortalized by Terebelo Distillery, which released a namesake New York Bourbon Whiskey to honor him and his legacy.

References

External links 
 Pirate's Cove: Abraham Blauvelt

17th-century births
17th-century Dutch explorers
17th-century pirates
1663 deaths
Dutch explorers of North America
Dutch Sephardi Jews
Dutch pirates
Dutch privateers
Explorers of Central America
Dutch people of the Eighty Years' War (United Provinces)
Sailors on ships of the Dutch West India Company
Year of birth uncertain